The papal conclave held from 1 May 1314 to 7 August 1316 in the apostolic palace of Carpentras and then the Dominican house in Lyon was one of the longest conclaves in the history of the Roman Catholic Church and the first conclave of the Avignon Papacy. The length of the conclave was due to the division of the cardinals into three factions: Italian (Orsini, Alberti, Stefaneschi, Caetani, Longhi, Fieschi, and both Colonna), Gascon (de Pellegrue, de Fougères, Nouvel, Teste, de Farges, de Garve, Daux, du Four, Raymond, and Godin), and French/Provençal (both Fredol, de Bec, Caignet de Fréauville, de Mandagot, and d'Euse).

The Italian faction wished to return the papacy to Rome, the Gascon faction—mostly composed of the relatives of the previous pope, Clement V, wished to retain the privileges and powers they had enjoyed during his rule, and the French/Provençal opposed these aims of the Italian and Gascon factions.

Cardinal electors
Among the cardinal electors there were an unusually high number of cardinal-nephews for two reasons: the previous pontiff, Clement V, had just set a record for the number of cardinal-nephews elevated by a single pontiff—soon to be surpassed by Pope Clement VI—and Clement V had reigned long enough that the only surviving Italian cardinals were those who were elevated at a younger age, who tended to be relatives of their elevator.

Procedure

Had the conclave taken place according to the rules prescribed by Clement V in Ne Romani (1312) and Pope Gregory X in Ubi periculum (1274), the cardinal electors would have had to meet in the diocese where the Curia was in residence (the place where letters and apostolic causes were heard), and the local magistrates would have had the authority to compel the departing cardinals to stay. Indeed, the election did begin in that location, the episcopal palace of Carpentras (north-east of Avignon), with 23 of the 24 eligible cardinals present (Fieschi was still in Italy).

The Italian cardinals opened by conclave by attempting to gain the support of the Provençal cardinals, proposing the candidacy of Languedocian jurist and fellow cardinal Guillaume de Mandagot (who had promised to restore the papacy to Rome and end the Gascon domination), whom the Gascons were able to defeat because of the personal opposition of Languedocian cardinal Berenguer Fredol, seniore. An impasse thereafter formed quickly and disputes between the servants of the Italian and Gascon cardinals broke out in the streets, aggravated by mercenary bands hired by the Gascon cardinal-nephews of Clement V and by the body of Clement V, still lying in the town square. Once the mercenaries openly besieged the conclave and the home in which the Italian cardinals were living, the Italian cardinals fled on July 24, 1314, and the rest of the College of Cardinals dispersed to Avignon, Orange, and Valence.

With both the Gascon and Italian cardinals threatening to hold their own elections (and thus begin another schism), Philip IV of France ("the Fair") convened a group of jurists to decide the matter, only to die on November 29, 1314. His son, Louis X of France sent a mission to disperse the Gascon cardinals and arranged for the cardinals to meet again in Lyon, through the emissary of his brother, Philip, Count of Poitiers (future Philip V of France), in March 1316. However, Louis X died, and Philip—forced to return to Paris to pursue his own interests—locked the cardinals in the Dominican convent of Lyon, leaving the Count of Forez to guard the conclave, on June 28, 1316 (previously, to get the cardinals to assemble, Philip had promised the cardinals that he would not lock them in, but he declared that the threat of schism annulled this promise).

At this point, the Gascon faction put forward the candidacy of a moderate member of their ranks, Arnaud Fournier, whose candidacy was rejected by the Count on Philip's instructions. The conclave proceeded to deadlock around the candidacies of Pellegrue, Mondagout, and Fredol. After a falling out between Napoleone Orsini and Pietro Colonna, the latter threw his support behind the Gascons, breaking the deadlock. This conclave was the last in which a compromise committee was tasked with selecting a candidate to present to the assembled cardinals. They proposed Jacques d'Euse as a compromise candidate with the votes of some of the Italian faction (who had begun to fear the influence of the Colonna), some of the Gascons, the Count, and Robert of Naples. The vote was made unanimous after an accessus, that is, allowing electors to change their votes. A final point in d'Euse's favor with all factions was the fact that he was 72. When d'Euse was elected on 7 August, he took the name John XXII.

Aftermath

With Pope John XXII reopening the disputed cases before the curia on October 1 in Avignon, the location of the papacy within France appeared to be secured permanently, as the percentage of Italians within the College was only expected to decline further. Although John XXII had been expected to die quickly, he lived until 1334, reaching the age of 90. John XXII's early disputes with the Franciscans, whom he persecuted due to their views on poverty, and Louis IV of Bavaria, whose claim to the Holy Roman Empire he disputed, merged when Louis proclaimed John XXII deposed in Rome and, with the assistance of an electorate of thirteen Roman clergy, chose a Franciscan Pietro da Corbara as Antipope Nicholas V on April 18, 1328. John XXII's standing in the Curia further diminished late in his papacy when he promoted the unpopular theological view that saints would not meet God until the Last Judgment.

While Clement V had lived as a guest in the Dominican monastery of Avignon, John XXII began the construction of the Palais des Papes on the bank of the Rhone in the Comtat Venaissin. Five more French popes were elected in succession—Benedict XII (1334–1342), Clement VI (1342–1352), Innocent VI (1352–1362), Urban V (1362–1370), and Gregory XI (1370–1378)—remaining in Avignon and growing the French super-majority within the College. When the papacy did revert to Rome after the return of Gregory XI to Italy to pursue his property claims in the Papal States during the War of the Eight Saints, the result was the Western Schism.

See also
Bernard Jarre

Notes

References
Philippe Levillain, ed.. 2002. The Papacy: An Encyclopedia. Routledge. .
Guillaume Mollat. "L'élection du pape Jean XXII." In: Revue d'histoire de l'Église de France, tome 1, n°1, 1910. pp. 34–49;
Walsh, Michael. 2003. The Conclave: A Sometimes Secret and Occasionally Bloody History of Papal Elections. Rowman & Littlefield. .

14th-century elections
1314
1315
1316
Avignon Papacy
Papal conclaves
14th-century Catholicism
14th century in Europe
Pope John XXII